"Supafly" is a single by British artist Fugative. It was released on 17 January 2010 on digital download on Hard2Beat Records. The track charted at number 48 on the UK Singles Chart.

Remixes 

There were six remixes available on digital download of "Supafly" – the longest is the "Static Shokx Remix", with runs for 6:06. Other remixes include the "A1 Bassline Remix", "Cookie Monsta Remix", "Roska Remix" & the "Bass Slammers Remix". On the other single of "Supafly" there is the "Tek-One Remix".

Track listing
Digital download
Disc 1

 "Supafly" (Radio Edit) – 3:30
 "Supafly" (A1 Bassline Remix) – 4:32
 "Supafly" (Static Shokx Remix) – 6:06
 "Supafly" (Cookie Monsta Remix) – 4:05
 "Supafly" (Roska Remix) – 4:29
 "Supafly" (Bass Slammers Remix) – 5:59

Disc 2

 "Supafly" (Radio Edit) – 3:30
 "Supafly" (Tek-One Remix) – 5:08

Chart performance 
The song first appeared on the UK Singles Chart on 30 January 2010 at number 48, then in its next week on 6 February 2010, it went down to number 98.

References

2009 songs
2010 singles
Fugative songs